Getting Closer! is an album by guitarist Phil Keaggy, released in 1985, on Nissi Records.

Track listing
All songs were written by Phil Keaggy, unless otherwise noted.

LP 
Side one
 "Where Has Our Love Gone" — 3:40
 "Passport" — 4:13
 "I Will Be There" — 5:00
 "Getting Closer" (Keaggy / Richard Souther / Dave Spurr) — 4:09
 "Movie" (Keaggy / John Mehler) — 4:59

Side two
 "Sounds" — 6:05
 "Like an Island" — 3:50
 "Look Deep Inside" — 5:08
 "Riverton" (Keaggy / Souther) — 3:54
 "Reaching Out" (Keaggy / Bernadette Keaggy) — 4:31

CD (re-release) 
 "Look Deep Inside"
 "Where Has Our Love Gone"
 "Movie" (Keaggy / Mehler)
 "Like an Island"
 "Riverton" (Keaggy / Souther)
 "Sounds"
 "Get Up and Go" (bonus track)
 "Passport"
 "Getting Closer" (Keaggy / Souther / Spurr)
 "Sunrise" (bonus track)
 "I Will Be There"
 "Reaching Out" (Keaggy / Keaggy)

The CD reissue adds "Get Up and Go" and "Sunrise", both recorded around the same time as the rest of the album but left off for various reasons.

Personnel 

 Phil Keaggy – guitars, bass, E-mu Drumulator programming and vocals
Smitty Price – keyboards and LinnDrum programming
 John Patitucci – bass guitar on "Sounds", "Passport", and "I Will Be There"
 Dave Spurr – drums on "Sounds", "Passport", and "I Will Be There"
 Richard Souther – keyboards on "Riverton"
 Rhett Lawrence – Fairlight synthesizer programming
 John Mehler – background vocals on "Movie"
 Jim Keltner – drums on "Sunrise" (CD reissue only)
 Bernadette Keaggy – spoken voice on "Get Up and Go" (CD reissue only)

Production

 Smitty Price – producer, audio engineer
 Phil Keaggy - producer
 Bob Cotton – executive producer, audio engineer
 Peter Haden – audio engineer
 Walter Grant – audio engineer
 Mike Ross – audio engineer
 Joe Bellamy – audio engineer
 Chris Taylor – audio engineer
 Bob Lockhart – audio engineer
 Terry Lang – audio engineer
 Weddington Studios, North Hollywood, California – recording studio
 Whitefield Studio, Santa Ana, California – recording studio
 Peace in the Valley, Arieta, California – recording studio
 Steve Hall – mastering at Futuredisc

References

1986 albums
Phil Keaggy albums